This is a list of open-air and living history museums by country.

Africa

Egypt 
 Luxor Upper Egypt
 Memphis ruins
 Karnak largest temple complex in the world

South Africa 
 Worcester Museum (Klein plasie open-air museum), Worcester Western Cape
 Sonskip / Aardskip earthship open-air museum, Orania Northern Cape

Tunisia 
 Djerba (Djerbahood).
 Matmata (Open-Air Museum of "Troglodyte" houses), Governorate of Gabes, south part of Tunisia, the whole village registered by UNESCO World Heritage, today is maintained by the Association of the Cultural Protection of Matmata)
 Oudhref (Open-air village museum), Governorate of Gabes

Asia

China
 Lei Cheng Uk Han Tomb Museum, Hong Kong
 Sam Tung Uk Museum, Hong Kong
 Xinye Village, Zhejiang

Indonesia 
 Taman Mini Indonesia Indah

Israel and the Golan Heights
Eretz Israel Museum
Kfar Kedem
Katzrin Ancient Village
 Nazareth Village

Japan 
 Edo-Tokyo Open Air Architectural Museum, Tokyo
 Hakone Open-Air Museum, Hakone, Kanagawa
 Meiji Mura, Inuyama, Aichi
 Nihon Minka-en (Japan Open-Air Folk House Museum), Kawasaki, Kanagawa
 Open-Air Museum of Old Japanese Farmhouses, Osaka
 Hida Minzoku Mura Folk Village, Takayama, Gifu
 Kyodo no mori, Fuchū, Tokyo
 Sankeien, Naka Ward, Yokohama
 Shikoku Mura, Takamatsu, Kagawa Prefecture
 Historical Village of Hokkaido (Hokkaidō Kaitaku no Mura), Sapporo, Hokkaido

Malaysia 
 Taman Tamadun Islam (Islamic Civilization Park), Kuala Terengganu, Terengganu

Philippines 
 Las Casas Filipinas de Acuzar

South Korea 
 Korean Folk Village, Yongin, Gyeonggi

Taiwan
 921 Earthquake Museum of Taiwan, Taichung
 Ju Ming Museum, New Taipei

Europe

Austria
 Austrian Open-Air Museum (Österreichisches Freilichtmuseum Stübing), Stübing
 Carinthian Open-Air Museum, Maria Saal
 Carnuntum, Petronell-Carnuntum
 Museums of Tyrolian Farmsteads, Kramsach
 Museumsdorf Niedersulz; Sulz im Weinviertel
 Salzburger Freilichtmuseum, Großgmain

Belgium 
 Atlantic Wall open-air museum (Atlantikwall Openluchtmuseum), (Ostend, West Flanders)
 Middelheim Open Air Sculpture Museum, (Antwerp)
 Openluchtmuseum Bachten de Kupe, Alveringem, West Flanders
 Bokrijk open-air museum (Openluchtmuseum Bokrijk), (near Genk, Province of Limburg)
 Museum of Rural Life in Wallonia (Musée de la Vie rurale en Wallonie), Saint-Hubert

Bulgaria 
 Etar Architectural-Ethnographic Complex, Gabrovo

Czech Republic 

 Hanácké open air museum (Hanácké Skanzen), Příkazy
 Museum of Folk Architecture in Kouřim (Muzeum lidových staveb v Kouřimi), Kouřim
 Polabské muzeum, Přerov nad Labem— the oldest open air museum in Central and Eastern Europe
 Skanzen Strážnice, Strážnice
 Skanzen Vysoký Chlumec, Vysoký Chlumec
 Skanzen Veselý kopec (museum of folk architecture in Veselý Kopec), Vysočina 
 Wallachian Open Air Museum (Wallachian Ethnographic Museum), Rožnov pod Radhoštěm

Denmark 
 Glud Museum, near Horsens
 Land of legends (Sagnlandet Lejre), Lejre
 Maribo Open-Air Museum, Maribo
 Open Air Museum (Kongens Lyngby), Kongens Lyngby
 The Funen Village in the Fruens Bøge district of Odense
 The Middle Ages Center in Sundby a suburb of Nykøbing Falster
 The Old Village, Hjerl Hede, Vinderup
 The Old Town - Den Gamle By, Aarhus
 Co-operative Village Nyvang, Andelslandsbyen Nyvang, Holbæk

Estonia
Estonian Open Air Museum, Tallinn
Mahtra Peasant Museum, Mahtra, Juuru Parish, Rapla County
Mihkli Farm Museum, Viki, Kihelkonna Parish, Saare County
Mõniste Peasant Museum, Kuutsi, Mõniste Parish, Võru County 
Põlva Peasant Museum, Karilatsi, Kõlleste Parish, Põlva County
Viimsi Open Air Museum, Pringi, Viimsi Parish; near Tallinn

Finland 
 Luostarinmäki, Turku
 Seurasaari Open-Air Museum, Helsinki
 Telkkämäki Heritage Farm, Kaavi
Turkansaari, Oulu

France 
 Musée de plein air des maisons comtoises, Nancray, Doubs, Franche-Comté
 Musée de plein air de Villeneuve-d'Ascq, Villeneuve-d'Ascq
 Ecomusée d'Alsace, Ungersheim

Germany 

 Amerang Open Air Museum, Bavaria
 Bavarian Forest Museum Village, Tittling
 Black Forest Open Air Museum "Vogtsbauernhof", Gutach, Baden-Württemberg
 Campus Galli medieval town with Carolingian monastery, Meßkirch, Baden-Württemberg
 Dat ole Huus, Wilsede, Lower Saxony
 Detmold Open-air Museum, Detmold, North Rhine-Westphalia
 Düppel museum village, Berlin
 Freilichtmuseum Glentleiten|Glentleiten Open Air Museum, Bavaria
 Groß Raden Archaeological Open Air Museum, nr Sternberg, Mecklenburg-Vorpommern
 Hagen Open-air Museum, Hagen, North Rhine-Westphalia
 Hessenpark, Neu-Anspach, Hesse
 Hitzacker Archaeological Centre, Hitzacker, Lower Saxony
 Hösseringen Museum Village, Hösseringen, Lower Saxony
 International Wind- and Watermill Museum, Gifhorn, Lower Saxony
 Kommern Open-air Museum, Mechernich, North Rhine-Westphalia
 Lindlar Open-air Museum, Lindlar, North Rhine-Westphalia
 Lower Bavarian Open-Air Museums, Finsterau and Massing
 Mödlareuth village, Bavaria and Thuringia
 Oerlinghausen Archaeological Open-Air Museum (Das Archäologische Freilichtmuseum Oerlinghausen), Oerlinghausen, North Rhine-Westphalia
 Ore Mountain Toy Museum, Seiffen, Saxony
 Pfahlbaumuseum Unteruhldingen, Unteruhldingen, Baden-Württemberg
 Rhineland-Palatinate Open Air Museum Bad Sobernheim (Rheinland-Pfälzisches Freilichtmuseum Bad Sobernheim), Bad Sobernheim, Rhineland-Palatinate
 Rischmannshof Heath Museum, Walsrode, Lower Saxony
 Roscheider Hof, Konz, Rhineland-Palatinate
 Slavic Village Passentin, near Neubrandenburg, Mecklenburg-Vorpommern
 Swabian Farm Museum ( Schwäbisches Bauernhofmuseum Illerbeuren), Illerbeuren, Bavaria
 Winsen Museum Farm, Winsen (Aller), Lower Saxony

Georgia 
 Tbilisi Open Air Museum of Ethnography, Tbilisi

Hungary 

 Hungarian open air museum (Szabadtéri Néprajzi Múzeum), Szentendre
 Szennai Szabadtéri Néprajzi Gyűjtemény, Szenna
 Göcseji Falumúzeum, Zalaegerszeg
 Őrségi Népi Műemlékegyüttes, Szalafő-(Pityerszer)
 Szabadtéri Néprajzi Múzeum, Ópusztaszer
 Sóstói Múzeumfalu, Nyíregyháza
 Vasi Múzeumfalu, Szombathely
 Hollókői Falumúzeum, Hollókő
 Szabadtéri Néprajzi Múzeum, Nagyvázsony
 Szabadtéri Néprajzi Múzeum, Tihany
 Emese Várispánság Szigethalom

Iceland 
 Árbæjarsafn

Ireland 
 Bunratty Castle and Folk Park, County Clare
 Connemara Heritage & History Centre
Kerry Bog Village
Ulster american folk park

Isle of Man 
 Cregneash - The first open-air museum in the British Isles

Italy 
 Museo a Cielo Aperto Ulàssai (Open-Air Museum Ulàssai)
 Museodiffuso
 Poggibonsi Archaeodrome - Open Air Museum
 Bostel di Rotzo - Castelletto di Rotzo, Vicenza

Latvia 

 The Ethnographic Open-Air Museum of Latvia

Lithuania

 Europos Parkas – museum of worlds contemporary art set in nature
 Rumšiškės open-air ethnographic museum

Moldova 
 Village Museum, Chișinău

Netherlands 

 Dutch Open Air Museum - Arnhem, Gelderland
 Archeon - Alphen aan den Rijn, South Holland
 De Spitkeet - Harkema, Friesland
 Limburgs Openluchtmuseum Eynderhoof - Nederweert-Eind, Limburg
 Eindhoven Museum - Eindhoven, North Brabant
 Hunebedcentrum - Borger, Drenthe
 Museum Village Orvelte - Orvelte, Drenthe
 Openluchtmuseum De Duinhuisjes - Rockanje, South Holland
 Ellert en Brammert - Schoonoord, Drenthe
 Erve Kots - Lievelde, Gelderland
 Openluchtmuseum Het Hoogeland - Warffum, Groningen
 It Damshûs - Nij Beets, Friesland
 Openluchtmuseum Ootmarsum - Ootmarsum Overijssel
 Van Gogh Village Nuenen - Nuenen North Brabant
 Zaanse Schans - Zaandam, North Holland
 Zuiderzee Museum - Enkhuizen, North Holland

North Macedonia 
 Tumba Madžari

Norway 

 Agatunet (see Norwegian language site Agatunet)
 Bjørgan parsonage, Kvikne
 Dølmotunet, Tolga (see North Østerdalen Museums)
 Folldal Bygdetun - Uppigard Streitlien, Folldal (see North Østerdalen Museums)
 Folldal Gruver, Folldal (see Norwegian language site Folldal Gruver)
 Husantunet, Alvdal (see North Østerdalen Museums)
 Norwegian Museum of Cultural History, Oslo
 Maihaugen, Lillehammer
 Os Museum - Oddentunet, Os (see North Østerdalen Museums)
 Romsdal Museum, Molde
 Rendalen Village Museum, Rendalen (see North Østerdalen Museums)
 Trøndelag folkemuseum, Sverresborg, Trondheim
 Tylldalen Bygdetun, Tylldalen (see North Østerdalen Museums)
 Tynset Bygdemuseum, Tynset (see North Østerdalen Museums)
 Vest-Agder Museum, Kristiansand
 Vollan Gård, Kvikne (see Norwegian language site Vollan gård)

Poland 
 Biskupin Archaeological Museum (Muzeum Archeologiczne w Biskupinie), about 90 kilometres (56 miles) northeast of Poznań
 Grodzisko Owidz|reconstruction of early medieval Slavic wooden stronghold, Owidz
 Ethnographic open-air museum in Sanok (Muzeum Budownictwa Ludowego w Sanoku), Sanok
 Folk Architecture Museum (Park Etnograficzny w Olsztynku), Olsztynek
  Kashubian Ethnographic Park (Kaszubski Park Etnograficzny), Wdzydze Kiszewskie
Kujawy and Dobrzyń Land Ethnographic Park, Kłóbka
 Museum of the Slovincian Village, Kluki
 Muzeum Kultury Ludowej w Kolbuszowej, Kolbuszowa
 Muzeum Etnograficzny w Zielonej Górze z siedzibą w Ochlii, Ochla, Lubusz Voivodeship
 Muzeum Kultury Ludowej, Osiek nad Notecią
 Muzeum Wsi Lubelskiej w Lublinie, Lublin
 Muzeum Wsi Mazowieckiej w Sierpcu, Sierpc
 Muzeum Wsi Radomskiej w Radomiu, Radom
 Nadwiślański Park Etnograficzny, Wygiełzów
 Open-air Museum of the Łódź Wooden Architecture
 Orawski Park Etnograficzny, Zubrzyca Górna
 Podlaskie Museum of Folk Culture, Wasilków
 Skansen Budownictwa Ludowego Zachodniej Wielkopolski, Wolsztyn
 Skansen Etnograficzny w Russowie, Russów
 Upper Silesian Ethnographic Park, Chorzów
 Ethnographic park of Dziekanowice, Dziekanowice 
 Railway Museum Chabowka, Chabówka Rolling-Stock Heritage Park "Skansen", Chabowka
 The Sądecki Ethnographic Park, Nowy Sącz
 The Opole Open-Air Museum of Rural Architecture, Opole

Romania
 ASTRA National Museum Complex, Sibiu
 Reșița Steam Locomotive Museum, Reșița
 Transylvanian Museum of Ethnography, Cluj-Napoca
 Village Museum "Dimitrie Gusti" - Muzeul Național al Satului "Dimitrie Gusti", Bucharest
 Banat Village Museum - Muzeul Satului Bănățean, Timișoara, https://en.wikipedia.org/wiki/Banat_Village_Museum, https://muzeulsatuluibanatean.ro/
 Museum of folk art and ethnography - Muzeul Satului din Baia Mare, Baia Mare
 Village Museum - Muzeul Satului Petrești Vrancea, Petrești Vrancea
 Museum "Haszmann Pál", Cernatu de Sus
 Museum of folk architecture - Muzeul Arhitecturii Populare, Gorj 
 Ethnographic museum - Muzeul Etnografic, Reghin
 Maramureș Village Museum, Sighetu Marmației
 Bucovina Village Museum - Muzeul Satului Bucovinean, Suceava
 Ednomon - Virtual Museum of Ethnographical Monuments in Romanian Open Air Museums
 Goleşti Viticulture And Tree Growing Museum, Golești

Russia

 Gornoknyazevsk
 Architectural-ethnographic museum "Khokhlovka", Perm
 Kizhi, Kizhi island
 Kolomenskoye, Moscow
 Museum of wooden architecture and folk art "Malye Korely", Arkhangelsk
 Semenkovo http://www.semenkovo.ru
 Ethnographic open air museum  "Torum Maa", Khanty-Mansiysk
 "Vitoslavlitsy" museum of wooden architecture, Veliky Novgorod
 Natural Ethnographic Park museum "Zhivun", Khanty-Muzhi, Shuryshkarsky District

Serbia 
 Drvengrad (Mećavnik, Küstendorf), Mokra Gora (Zlatibor)
 Staro selo (Old Village open-air museum), Sirogojno (Zlatibor)

Slovakia 

 Banská Štiavnica
 Bardejov
 Humenné
 Kysuce Village Museum, Nova Bystrica
 Museum of folk architecture, Čičmany
 Museum of Liptov Village, Pribylina
 Museum of the Slovak Village, Múzeum Slovenskej Dediny, Martin
 Slovak Agricultural Museum, Nitra
 Stará Ľubovňa
 Svidník
 Vlkolínec
 Zuberec – Brestová, Orava Village Museum

Slovenia 
 Piran
 Rogatec
 Velika Planina

Spain 
 Museo de Escultura al Aire Libre de Alcalá de Henares, Alcalá de Henares
 Museu d'escultures del Bosc de Can Ginebreda, Porqueres (Girona)
 Poble Espanyol, Barcelona
Numantia, Garray, Soria

Sweden 
 Jamtli, Östersund
 , 
 Kulturen, Lund
 Kulturens Östarp, Östarp
 Skansen, Stockholm
 Foteviken Museum, Höllviken
Torekällberget Södertälje

Switzerland 
 Ballenberg, Brienz

Turkey 
Ihlara
Derinkuyu Underground City
Kaymaklı Underground City
Göreme
Ürgüp
Karatepe-Aslantaş Open Air Museum

Ukraine 
 Baturyn Fortress Citadel, Baturyn
 Mamayeva Sloboda Cossack village Museum, Kyiv
 Open-air Museum of Architecture and Ethnography in Pyrohiv, Kyiv
 Museum of Folk Architecture and Culture, (see Kryvka Church), Lviv
 Museum of Folk Architecture and Life, Uzhhorod
 Museum of Folk Life and Architecture, Pereiaslav
 National Reserve Khortytsia, Zaporizja
 Museum "Old Village", Kolochava
 Historical and ethnographic museum, Sarny

United Kingdom

England
 Anne of Cleves House, Lewes
 Avoncroft Museum of Historic Buildings, Worcestershire
 Amberley Working Museum, Amberley, West Sussex
 Beamish, North of England Open Air Museum, Beamish, County Durham
 Black Country Living Museum, Dudley, West Midlands
 Blists Hill Victorian Town, Telford, Shropshire
 Butser Ancient Farm, Chalton, Hampshire
 Chiltern Open Air Museum, Chalfont St. Giles, Buckinghamshire
 Church Farm Museum, Agricultural museum and collection of indigenous buildings, Skegness
 Cogges Manor Farm Museum, Witney, Oxfordshire
 Little Woodham, Gosport, Hampshire
 Manor Farm Country Park, Bursledon, Hampshire
Milestones Museum, Basingstoke, Hampshire
 Morwellham Quay, Devon
 Murton Park / Yorkshire Museum of Farming in Murton, York
 Museum of East Anglian Life, Stowmarket, Suffolk
National Coal Mining Museum for England, Wakefield, West Yorkshire
 Rural Life Living Museum, Tilford, Surrey
 Ryedale Folk Museum, North York Moors, North Yorkshire
 Weald and Downland Open Air Museum, Sussex
 West Stow Anglo-Saxon Village, Suffolk
 West Yorkshire Folk Museum, in grounds of Shibden Hall, Halifax
 Wimpole Home Farm, Cambridgeshire
 York Castle Museum, York

Scotland
 National Museum of Rural Life, East Kilbride, Lanarkshire 
 Scottish Crannog Centre at Loch Tay, Perth and Kinross
 Auchindrain – near Inveraray, Argyll and Bute
 The Gearrannan Blackhouses, Isle of Lewis
 Skye Museum of Island Life, near Kilmuir, Isle of Skye, 
 Highland Folk Museum, Newtonmore 
 Industrial open-air museum of New Lanark

Wales
 St Fagans National History Museum, St Fagans, Cardiff

Northern Ireland
 Ulster American Folk Park, Castleton, County Tyrone
 Ulster Folk & Transport Museum, Cultra, County Down

North America

Canada

 Barkerville, British Columbia
 Ball's Falls Conservation Area, Jordan, Ontario
 Black Creek Pioneer Village, Toronto, Ontario
 Burnaby Village Museum, Burnaby, British Columbia
 Canada's Polish Kashub Heritage Museum & Skansen, Wilno, Ontario
 Discovery Harbour, Penetanguishene, Ontario
 Doon Heritage Village, Kitchener, Ontario
 Fort Henry, Ontario
 Fort Edmonton Park, Edmonton, Alberta
 Fort Langley National Historic Site, Fort Langley, British Columbia
 Fortress of Louisbourg, Louisbourg, Nova Scotia
 Fort William Historical Park, Thunder Bay, Ontario
 Fort York, Toronto, Ontario
 Greater Sudbury Heritage Museums
 Halifax Citadel National Historic Site of Canada (Citadel Hill), Halifax, Nova Scotia
 Highland Village Museum, Iona, Nova Scotia
 Heritage Park Historical Village, Calgary, Alberta
 Kalyna Country, an ecomuseum
 Kawartha Settlers' Village, Bobcaygeon, Ontario
 Kings Landing Historical Settlement, Prince William, New Brunswick
 Lower Fort Garry National Historic Site, Selkirk, Manitoba
 Markham Museum, Markham, Ontario
 Mennonite Heritage Village, Steinbach, Manitoba
 Sainte-Marie among the Hurons, Midland, Ontario
Screaming Heads, Burk's Falls, Ontario
 Sherbrooke Village, Sherbrooke, Nova Scotia
 Ukrainian Cultural Heritage Village, Alberta
 Upper Canada Village, Morrisburg, Ontario
 Village Historique Acadien, Caraquet, New Brunswick
 Village Québécois d'Antan, Drummondville, Quebec
 West Coast Railway Heritage Park, Squamish, British Columbia
 Westfield Heritage Village, Rockton, Ontario
 Pickering Museum Village, Pickering, Ontario

United States

Oceania

Australia
 The Pioneer Settlement, Swan Hill, Victoria, Australia's First Open Air Museum, opened 1966.
 Old Gippstown, Moe, Victoria opened 1973
 Port Arthur, Tasmania
 Sovereign Hill, Ballarat, Victoria
 Millewa Pioneer Forest and Historical Village, Meringur, Victoria
 Flagstaff Hill Maritime Museum, Warrnambool, Victoria
 Old Sydney Town, Somersby, New South Wales (now closed)
 Miles Historical Village and Museum, Miles, Queensland
 Old Tailem Town, Tailem Bend, South Australia
 Australiana Pioneer Village, Wilberforce, NSW

New Zealand
 Ferrymead, Christchurch a recreation of a 1900 -1920 settlement in Canterbury, complete with homes, stores, shops and working steam trains
 Howick Colonial Village, Auckland, an authentic 1850s Fencible village featuring old homes, stores and community halls. There is also occasional re creation days with volunteers in period dress
 Shantytown, Greymouth, a Historic them park opened in 1971 dedicated to the 1860s to 1900s Gold rush on the West Coast. The sheltered location includes several old time stores, printing press and a small model train that goes into a gully, you can also pan for Gold and take it home with you.
 Thames and Coromandel, this scenic region outside and near Auckland features several working mine attractions, museums and historic stores dedicated to the late 19th century gold boom in the Coromandel. Thames has several old mines, the Pump Museum and School of Mines, the Karangahake gorge features historic relics in a scenic walk and Waihi and Coromandel townships also preserve their God Rush heritage.
 Gibbs Farm - private outdoor sculpture garden developed by Alan Gibbs.  Located on North Island.

South America

Argentina 
 Caminito

Brazil 
 Museu ao ar livre de Orleans 
 Inhotim

Suriname 
 Fort Nieuw-Amsterdam

Living transportation museums

 Brooklands in Weybridge, Elmbridge, Surrey, England (aviation and motorcar museum)
 Çamlık Railway Museum (Çamlık Tren Müzesi) in Çamlık, Turkey (railway museum)
 Chesapeake and Ohio Canal National Historical Park from Georgetown, Washington, D.C. to Cumberland, Maryland (heritage canal)
 Cumbres and Toltec Scenic Railroad from Chama, New Mexico to Antonito, Colorado (heritage railway)
 Danish Tramway Museum (Sporvejsmuseet Skjoldenæsholm) in Skjoldenæsholm, Denmark
 Delta Queen travels along the Mississippi River and tributaries (heritage river steamboat)
 Deutsches Schiffahrtsmuseum in Bremerhaven, Germany (maritime museum)
 Edaville Railroad in South Carver, Massachusetts (heritage railway)
 Hiroshima City Transportation Museum in Hiroshima, Japan (street railway museum)
 Mystic Seaport in Mystic, Connecticut (maritime museum)
 National Tramway Museum in Derbyshire, England (heritage street railway)
 Old Rhinebeck Aerodrome in Rhinebeck, New York (aviation museum)
 Roscoe Village in Coshocton, Ohio (along the former Ohio & Erie Canal, nearby Monticello III canal boat)
 San Francisco Maritime National Historical Park, San Francisco, California (includes a fleet of historic vessels)
 Seashore Trolley Museum in Kennebunkport, Maine (heritage railway)
 Shuttleworth Collection in Bedfordshire, England (aviation museum)
 Narrow Gauge Railway Museum in Wenecja near Żnin
 Skansen Parowozownia Kościerzyna in Kościerzyna, Pomeranian Voivodeship, Poland (heritage railway)
 Steamtown National Historic Site in Scranton, Pennsylvania (heritage railway)
 Valley Railroad Company in Essex, Connecticut (heritage railway)
 White Pass and Yukon Route from Skagway, Alaska to Whitehorse, Yukon (heritage railway)
 Wiscasset, Waterville and Farmington Railway in Alna, Maine (heritage railway)
 Royal Malaysian Air Force Museum, Kuala Lumpur, Malaysia (military aviation)

Ecological and environmental living museums
Some ecological living museums are zoos
 California Living Museum, Bakersfield, California, United States
 Virginia Living Museum, Newport News, Virginia, United States
 Nonsuch Island Living Museum, Bermuda
 Penang Forestry Museum, Penang, Malaysia
 Ball's Falls Conservation Area, Jordan, Ontario, Canada

References

External links

 Association for Living History, Farm and Agricultural Museums
 Revista Digital Nueva Museologia Latin American Theory
 European Open-air Museums An extensive list of Open-air museums in Europe.
 America's Outdoor History Museums
 Photos from Museum of Folk Architecture and Life

Museum websites
 Open Air Museum Bokrijk Leading open-air museum of Belgium, Flanders.
 Přerov nad Labem open-air museum - photo gallery
 Valachian Ethnographic Museum in Rožnov pod Radhoštěm, Czech Republic
 Hjerl Hede- An open-air museum in Denmark showing life from the early days until about 100 years ago.
 The Old Town (Den Gamle By)- An open-air museum in Denmark showing urban life.
 Jamtli – One of Sweden's largest and oldest regional open-air museums, in Östersund.
 :fr:Musée de plein air de Villeneuve-d'Ascq

Lists of museums
Architectural history
Vernacular architecture